Álvaro de Mendoza may refer to:

 Álvaro Eugenio de Mendoza Caamaño y Sotomayor (1671–1761), Spanish Roman Catholic cardinal
 Álvaro de Mendoza (bishop) (died 1631), Spanish Roman Catholic bishop
 Álvaro de Mendoza (conquistador), conquistador in Colombia; see Rionegro